Ibn al-Junayd al-Eskafi (َArabic: ابن الجنید الاسکافی) was one of the first eminent Shi'a jurists during the fourth century lunar hijrah.

Early life 
Abu Ali Muhammad ibn Ahmad Katib Iskafi (tenth century AD/fourth century lunar) was born in Iskaf, a region near Nahrawan Canal  in Iraq. His date of birth is uncertain. He may have traveled to Nishapur. He may have visited Muhammed Ibn Hosein Alavi. According to Shaykh Mufid's sayings, it seems that Ibn Jonayd passed most of his life in Baghdad. He may have had communication with the twelfth Imam.

Jurisprudence 
He took a different approach in understanding Shia traditions. He believed in a theological basis for interpretation of Hadith. He believed that we must commit to Khabar Vahed and Qyas in jurisprudence. He acted like antecedent jurists such as Fazl ibn Shazan and Younes ibn Abdul Rahman. One of his characteristics in Fiqh discussion was that he believed  to Ihtiyat (probability) approximately in most problems. in other words, the principle of Ihtiyyat is prevalent in his juridical works. He employed other ideas in shia jurisprudence such as:
 Acting according to reason and justification
 Challenges with Akhbari school
 Clarity in explaining the reason for a judgment
 Establish dynamic basic for shia jurisprudence

Works 
He had special skill in writing and became known as Katib by scholars. He wrote nearly in all Islamic sciences, particularly jurisprudence, theology and apologetics, such as:
Tahzib Al Shia for Ahkam-e-shariah(purification of shia for religion's judgments)
 Al Nosrah Le Ahkam Al Itrat
 Two thousand problems in Shariah
 Traditions of Sshia
 Tabserat A Aref and Naqd Al Zaef
 Kashf Al Asrar
He also wrote about the art of writing: Ilm Al Nijabah Fi Ilm Al Kitabah and Al Tahrir va Taqrir.

See also 
Ibn Fahd Helli
Principles of Islamic jurisprudence

References

External links 

Date of birth missing
Date of death missing
Sharia
Shia scholars of Islam
Muslim scholars of Islamic jurisprudence
10th-century Muslim scholars of Islam